Lomuna is a monotypic moth genus in the subfamily Arctiinae erected by William D. Field in 1952. Its single species, Lomuna nigripuncta, was first described by George Hampson in 1900. It is found in Puerto Rico and Colombia.

References

Lithosiini
Monotypic moth genera
Moths of the Caribbean
Moths of South America